Neoascia guttata is a species of Hoverfly in the family Syrphidae.

Distribution
Canada.

References

Eristalinae
Insects described in 2019
Diptera of North America